Robert Andrei Ion (born 5 September 2000) is a Romanian professional footballer who plays mainly as a attacking midfielder for Liga II club Politehnica Iași.

Club career

Farul Constanța
In the summer of 2022, Farul Constanța announced the signing of Ion on a three-year contract. On 7 December 2022, just after 3 matches played in Liga I, Ion was released from the club after having his contract mutually terminated.

Politehnica Iași
On 28 December 2022, Politehnica Iași announced the singing of Robert Ion.

Career statistics

Club
Statistics accurate as of match played 9 November 2022.

References

External links

Robert Ion at lpf.ro

2000 births
Living people
Footballers from Bucharest
Romanian footballers
Association football forwards
Liga I players
Liga II players
FC Steaua București players
LPS HD Clinceni players
FC Voluntari players
FCV Farul Constanța players
FC Politehnica Iași (2010) players